The Ghushkhaneh garden is a historical garden in Isfahan, Iran. The garden belongs to the era of Abbas I. In the era of Safavids, the ceremony of samite confessing of the King took place here.

Etymology 
The word Ghushkhaneh consists of two words: Ghush and Khaneh. Ghush (quş) is an Azeri word and means "bird", Khaneh is a Persian word (also used in Azeri) and means house or home. The name of the garden is Ghushkhaneh, because in the Safavid era, the King's falcons were kept in the garden.

References 

Buildings and structures in Isfahan
Gardens in Iran